Zingalaing is a village in Kale Township, Kale District, in the Sagaing Region of western Burma. It is located to the south of Kalaymyo.

References

External links
Maplandia World Gazetteer

Populated places in Kale District
Kale Township